No Angel is the debut studio album by English singer-songwriter Dido. Originally released on 1 June 1999 in the United States, the album found a mass audience when it was released worldwide in February 2001. By 2003, the album had sold more than 15 million copies worldwide, and was the second best-selling album of the 2000s in the United Kingdom, behind James Blunt's Back to Bedlam.

As of 2015 No Angel is the 27th best-selling album in UK chart history. In 2019 it was listed the ninth best-selling album of the 21st century in the UK. It was also among ten albums nominated for the best British album of the previous 30 years by the Brit Awards in 2010, ultimately losing to (What's the Story) Morning Glory? by Oasis.

Background
Recording for the album began when Dido officially signed a record deal with Arista Records. As well as recording ten new tracks, Dido took two previously recorded tracks from her demo collection, Odds & Ends, and used them for the album, with "Take My Hand" appearing in its original form, and "Sweet Eyed Baby" being remixed to create "Don't Think of Me". During recording for the album, a deal to release the album in the US was finalised, however, a deal to secure European sales of the album was not completed, thus meaning that when the album was released in June 1999, it was released exclusively in America. Prior to the album's release, a promotional sampler titled The Highbury Fields EP was issued to radio stations, featuring four tracks from the album, and "Worthless", another track from the demo collection Odds & Ends.

Singles
The album's lead single, "Here with Me", was initially released in the US on 17 May 1999, and it subsequently became the theme song for the popular American science fiction television series Roswell. The song reached No. 21 on the Adult Top 40 chart. It became globally available in February 2001, peaking at No. 4 in the UK. In an attempt to boost album sales, a second single, "Don't Think of Me", was released on 7 February 2000, but it did not fare as well as expected, only peaking at No. 35 on the Adult Top 40 chart in the US, spending only seven weeks on the chart.

"Thank You" was released as the album's third single on 18 September 2000. It became the biggest hit of No Angel, reaching No. 3 in both the US and the UK, where it was certified silver by the British Phonographic Industry for selling over 200,000 copies in the country. It also topped several Billboard charts such as Adult Top 40, Adult Contemporary and Dance Club Songs. The album's third European single, "Hunter", was released on 18 June 2001 in the US and on 10 September 2001 in the UK, reaching the top 20 in the latter country. It spent fifteen weeks on the Adult Top 40 chart peaking at No. 16, while it became a top-10 hit on the dance charts in America. A fourth single, "All You Want", was released on 10 December 2001, but it was ineligible to chart due to only being released as a 3-inch mini-single in the UK.

Some of the album tracks were later licensed for use in television programmes, with "My Life" appearing in an episode of the drama series Angel Eyes, as well as alongside  "My Life", "Honestly OK" and "Thank You" in several episodes of the Warner Bros. show Popular. "My Lover's Gone" was featured on the soundtrack of Brazilian telenovela "O Clone" and became a smash radio hit in the country.

Critical reception

Q listed No Angel as one of the best 50 albums of 2001. The album won the Best British album accolade on 2002 Brit Awards.

Commercial performance
No Angel was first released in North America on 1 June 1999 and entered the Top Heatseekers chart at number fifty a month and a half later. Twelve months after its original release, it hit number one on the chart and simultaneously entered the Billboard 200 at No. 144, which was attributed to extensive touring by Dido in clubs and small venues across the country and radio exposure in adult contemporary stations. However, No Angel continued to climb up the chart afterwards largely due to the sampling of "Thank You" on hit single "Stan" by American rapper Eminem. By January 2001, the album finally cracked the top ten of the Billboard 200 moving 17–9. Six weeks later, it reached its peak position of number-four on its 40th week on the chart, while "Thank You" was already a top twenty hit on the Hot 100 Airplay. No Angel spent 69 weeks on the Billboard 200 and became the 17th best-selling album of 2001 in the country. By February 2002 US sales for the album stood at a total of 2,814,000 copies sold. According to Nielsen Soundscan, the album has sold over 4.2 million units in the US and has been certified quadruple platinum by the Recording Industry Association of America. Meanwhile, in Canada, No Angel also reached number-four on the albums chart and sold over 400,000 copies in the country, which resulted in a quadruple platinum certification by the Canadian Recording Industry Association. Additionally, the Association of Producers of Phonograms and Videograms certified the album platinum for selling over 150,000 units in Mexico.

Following the success of "Stan" in Australia and the UK, where it hit number one, No Angel was finally distributed in other markets outside North America in late 2000. The album made its debut on the UK Albums Chart in October of the same year at number fifty, and entered the top ten for the first time on its 14th week by climbing 11–5. By early February 2001, No Angel finally reached the top of the chart and remained there for six consecutive weeks. In early October, it returned to number-one for a seventh and final week at the top. Notably, the album re-entered the top ten on its 126th week on the chart at the end of the busy Christmas shopping period of 2003 due to the massive success of her second studio album Life for Rent. No Angel became the top-selling album of 2001 and the 27th highest-selling of 2002. Moreover, it has been recognised as the 26th best-selling album of all time in the country, with sales that exceed 3,088,700 copies, resulting in a tenfold platinum certification by the British Phonographic Industry. Meanwhile, in neighbouring Ireland, the album was listed as the second highest-selling of 2001 by the Irish Recorded Music Association, behind Swing When You're Winning by Robbie Williams. No Angel also experienced success in Germany, selling 750,000 units, which resulted in a triple gold certification by the Bundesverband Musikindustrie.

Furthermore, No Angel entered the Australian albums chart at number twenty-one and quickly rose to the top on its sixth week, dethroning The Marshall Mathers LP by Eminem. It remained there for eight consecutive weeks. No Angel finished 2001 as the second highest-selling album of the year, behind the Moulin Rouge! soundtrack, and was also amongst the forty best-selling records of the following year. The album received a sextuple platinum certification by the Australian Recording Industry Association, denoting shipments of over 420,000 units in the country. In New Zealand, No Angel topped the albums chart for nine non-consecutive weeks and spent fifty-nine weeks inside the top forty. By the spring of 2002, the album had sold 75,000 copies and was certified five times platinum by the Recording Industry Association of New Zealand. In 2001 the album was the number 1 best-selling album, selling 8.6 million copies worldwide.

Track listing
Credits adapted from the album's liner notes.

Personnel
Credits adapted from the album's liner notes.

 Dido – lead vocals (all tracks), production (tracks 1, 2, 4–12), keyboards (tracks 7, 9), recorder (track 6)
 Rollo – production (tracks 6–12), programming (tracks 6, 8–10, 12)
 Rick Nowels – production, keyboards and acoustic guitar (tracks 1, 2, 5), chamberlin (tracks 2, 5)
 Mark Bates – piano (tracks 3, 6, 9, 11), keyboards (tracks 6, 11, 12), wurlitzer and organ (track 11)
 Phill Brown – mixing (tracks 6–11), recording (tracks 9, 10)
 Goetz – recording (tracks 6–8, 11, 12), mixing (tracks 4, 12), additional recording (track 9)
 Pauline Taylor – additional background vocals (tracks 2, 3, 12), background vocals (tracks 8, 11), additional arrangement (track 8), background vocal arrangement (track 11)
 Ash Howes – recording and mixing (tracks 1, 2, 5)
 John Themis – electric guitar and percussion (tracks 1, 2, 5)
 Paulie Herman – guitar (tracks 3, 6, 8, 9), harmonica (track 9)
 Gavyn Wright – strings (tracks 1, 3, 11, 12)
 Wil Malone – string arrangement small (tracks 1, 3, 11, 12)
 Duncan Bridgeman – production, keyboards, programming and recording (track 4)
 Aubrey Nunn – bass guitar (tracks 4, 8, 10, 12)
 Matty Benbrook – live drums (tracks 8, 9, 11), programming (track 7)
 James Sanger – programming (tracks 1, 2, 5)
 Paul Statham – keyboards (tracks 1, 10), piano (track 10)
 Richie Stevens – additional live drums (tracks 2, 5) additional percussion (track 5)
 Dave Randall – guitar (tracks 4, 10, 12)
 Mal Hyde Smith – percussion (tracks 6, 9, 12)
 Peter Vittese – keyboards and additional programming (track 1)
 Randy Wine – engineering (tracks 2, 5)
 Rusty Anderson – electric guitar (tracks 2, 5)
 John Pierce – bass (tracks 2, 5)
 Youth – production and bass (track 3)
 Geoff Dugmore – live drums and percussion (track 3)
 Hugo Nicolson – recording and mixing (track 3)
 Nick "Manasseh" Raphael – dub effects and additional programming (track 7)
 Bruce Aisher – additional keyboards (track 7), keyboards (track 8)
 Sudha Kheterpal – percussion (tracks 8, 10)
 Rachael Brown – background vocals (tracks 8, 11)
 Sister Bliss – production and keyboards (track 12)
 Jony Rockstar – programming (track 3)
 Jamie Catto – production (track 4)
 Aquila – background vocals (track 8)
 Martin McCorry – electric guitar (track 9)
 Tim Vogt – bass (track 9)
 Mark Felton – harmonica (track 10)

Credits

 Tom Coyne – mastering
 Sheri G. Lee – art direction
 Andrew Southam – photography
 Len Irish – photography
 Basia Zamorska – styling
 Laura de Leon – hair
 Heidi Lee – makeup

Charts

Weekly charts

Year-end charts 

|+Year-end chart performance for No Angel

|-
! scope="row"|Canadian Albums (Nielsen SoundScan)
| 81
|-
! scope="row"|UK Albums (OCC)
|135
|-
! scope="row"| US Billboard 200
| 175
|}

|-

|-
!scope="row"|Argentine Albums (CAPIF)
| style="text-align:center;"|16
|-
!scope="row"|Australian Albums (ARIA)
| style="text-align:center;"|2
|-
!scope="row"|Austrian Albums (Ö3 Austria)
|style="text-align:center;"|9
|-
!scope="row"|Belgian Albums (Ultratop Flanders)
| style="text-align:center;"|11
|-
!scope="row"|Belgian Alternative Albums (Ultratop Flanders)
|5
|-
!scope="row"|Belgian Albums (Ultratop Wallonia)
| style="text-align:center;"|13
|-
!scope="row"|Canadian Albums (Nielsen SoundScan)
|16
|-
!scope="row"|Danish Albums (Hitlisten)
|style="text-align:center;"|5
|-
!scope="row"| Dutch Albums (Album Top 100)
| style="text-align:center;"| 12
|-
!scope="row"|European Albums (Music & Media)
|1
|-

|-
!scope="row"|French Albums (SNEP)
| style="text-align:center;"|3
|-
!scope="row"|German Albums (Offizielle Top 100)
|style="text-align:center;"|2
|-
!scope="row"|Irish Albums (IRMA)
|style="text-align:center;"|2
|-
!scope="row"|Italian Albums (FIMI)
|style="text-align:center;"| 7
|-
!scope="row"|New Zealand Albums (RMNZ)
|style="text-align:center;"| 2
|-
!scope="row"|Spanish Albums (AFYVE)
| 38
|-
! scope="row"|Swedish Albums (Sverigetopplistan)
| 15
|-
! scope="row"|Swedish Albums & Compilations (Sverigetopplistan)
| 21
|-
! scope="row"|Swiss Albums (Schweizer Hitparade)
| 4
|-
! scope="row"| UK Albums (OCC)
| style="text-align:center;"|1
|-
! scope="row"| US Billboard 200
| 17
|-
! scope="row"| Worldwide Albums (IFPI)
| style="text-align:center;"| 2
|}

|-

|-
! scope="row"|Australian Albums (ARIA)
|43
|-
!scope="row"|Belgian Albums (Ultratop Flanders)
|70
|-
!scope="row"|Belgian Alternative Albums (Ultratop Flanders)
|32
|-
!scope="row"|Belgian Albums (Ultratop Wallonia)
|57
|-
!scope="row"|Canadian Alternative Albums (Nielsen SoundScan)
| 75
|-
! scope="row"|European Albums (Music & Media)
|24
|-
!scope="row"|French Albums (SNEP)
|38
|-
! scope="row"|UK Albums (OCC)
| style="text-align:center;"|27
|}

|-

|-
!scope="row"|Belgian Albums (Ultratop Flanders)
| 98
|-
! scope="row"| UK Albums (OCC)
| 89
|}

|-

|-
!scope="row"|Belgian Midprice Albums (Ultratop Flanders)
|10
|-
!scope="row"|Belgian Midprice Albums (Ultratop Wallonia)
|11
|-
!scope="row"|UK Albums (OCC)
| 98
|}

|-

|-
!scope="row"|Belgian Midprice Albums (Ultratop Flanders)
|44
|}

Decade-end charts

All-time charts

Certifications and sales

See also
List of best-selling albums
List of best-selling albums by women
List of best-selling albums in Europe
List of best-selling albums in France
List of best-selling albums in United Kingdom

References

External links
 Dido — official website.

Dido (singer) albums
1999 debut albums
Cheeky Records albums
Albums produced by Pascal Gabriel
Albums produced by Rick Nowels
Albums produced by Rollo Armstrong
Brit Award for British Album of the Year
Dream pop albums by English artists
Folktronica albums
Albums recorded at The Church Studios